Winchus Hirka (Quechua winchus, winchu hummingbird, hirka mountain, "hummingbird mountain", also spelled Huinchusjirca) is a mountain in the northern part of the Cordillera Blanca in the Andes of Peru which reaches a height of approximately . It is located in the Ancash Region, Corongo Province, Cusca District. It lies south of a mountain named Winchus (Guinchos).

Sources

Mountains of Peru
Mountains of Ancash Region